Parehas ang Laban is a 2001 Philippine action film written and directed by William Mayo. The film stars Ian Veneracion and John Regala.

Cast
 Ian Veneracion as David Valdez
 John Regala as Brix Vergado
 Dave Payot as Young Brix
 Angela Velez as Capt. Emma Garcia
 Daisy Reyes as Mildred
 Brando Legaspi as Sgt. Gomez
 John Apacible as Cpl. Zamora
 Alex Bolado as Cpl. Burgos
 Robert Rivera as Col. Lopez
 Nognog 	Nognog as Benjo
 Kenneth Ramos as Sonny
 Zandro Zamora as Brando
 Conrad Poe as Barca
 Robert Talby as Cortez
 Benny Cheng as Benny
 Lito Marcos as Lope
 Ralph Jervis as Fat Policeman
 Elaine Dizon as Call Girl
 Alex David as Brix's Father

References

External links

2001 films
2001 action films
Filipino-language films
Philippine action films